How to Be a Human Being is the second studio album by English indie rock group Glass Animals. It was released on 26 August 2016 by Wolf Tone and Caroline International in Europe, and Harvest Records in the United States. The album received generally favourable reviews from music critics, who complimented its "sense of wonder" and "immediate impression", but felt it was somewhat premature. There are a total of 11 songs on the track listing, along with 11 characters illustrated on the cover art. Each song, along with its unique personality and quirks, represents a person on the album. The album was nominated for the 2017 Mercury Prize.

Background 
Following the release of their debut studio album Zaba, Glass Animals began an aggressive tour which saw them play over 140 concerts in Europe, Australia, the United States and Mexico. They appeared at Glastonbury, Falls Music Festival and Southbound in 2014, Coachella, Wakarusa, Bonnaroo, Firefly, Glastonbury again, Lollapalooza, Osheaga and Reading and Leads in 2015, and the Forecastle Festival in 2016.

How to Be a Human Being was simultaneously announced with the release of "Life Itself" and its respective music video. The foursome toured Australia for their second time, before they returned to North America for the album's release. Four days after the album was released, the band appeared on Jimmy Kimmel Live!, their third appearance on primetime television.

The band wrote 11 songs based on 11 different characters, many of which were inspired by people they met and stories they were told during their travels while promoting Zaba. Each character was portrayed on the album cover, and some appeared in music videos for their respective songs. Among the actors portraying the characters were Brock Brenner, Dorian Hampton, Camila Ivera, Pat Janssen and Heidi Kaufman.

Commercial performance
The album made a debut on US charts with first week sales of 14,575 copies, with 10,117 being pure album sales.

Track listing 

Notes
 "Premade Sandwiches" is stylized "[Premade Sandwiches]"
 On CD copies of the album, "Premade Sandwiches" is put at the end of the track "Cane Shuga" instead of being its own track

Personnel 
Glass Animals
 Dave Bayley – vocals, programming, production (all tracks), guitar (1, 2, 4, 5, 8–10), percussion (1–5, 8–11); keyboards, synthesizer (1, 3–5, 8–11); art direction, design
 Drew MacFarlane – programming (1, 3–11), percussion (1–5, 8–11), keyboards, synthesizer (1, 3–5, 8–11), additional vocals (3, 8), guitar (4, 5, 9, 10), piano (11)
 Edmund Irwin-Singer – programming (1, 3–11), keyboards (1, 3–5, 8–11), percussion (1–5, 8–11); piano, synthesizer (1, 3–5, 8–11)
 Joe Seaward – drums, percussion (1–5, 8–11); additional vocals (4), programming (6, 7)

Additional personnel
 Tom Coyne – mastering
 David Wrench – mixing (1, 3, 5, 8, 9, 11)
 Matt Wiggins – mixing (2, 4, 6, 7, 10), engineering (all tracks)
 Riley MacIntyre – engineering assistance
 Marta Salogni – mixing assistance
 Mat Cook – art direction, design
 Neil Krug – photography
 Charlie Seaward – flute (5)
 Paul Epworth – executive production

Charts

Certifications

References 

2016 albums
Glass Animals albums
Music in Oxford
Concept albums
Caroline Records albums
Harvest Records albums